Henri Jaspar (28 July 1870 – 15 February 1939) was a Belgian Catholic Party politician.

Jaspar was born in Schaerbeek and trained as a lawyer. He represented Liège as a Catholic in the Belgian Chamber of Representatives from 1919 until 1936. He helped create the Belgium-Luxembourg Economic Union in 1921, and served as the prime minister of Belgium from 1926 to 1931. In 1924 he was made an honorary minister of State.

He held several ministerial positions including;
Minister of Economic Affairs (1918–1920)
Foreign Minister (1920–1924 and 1934)
Minister of Finance (1932–1934)

Honours 
 : Minister of State, by Royal decree
 : Grand Cross in the Order of Leopold
 Grand Cross in the Order of Pius IX
 : Grand Cross in the Legion of Honour
 Grand Cross in the Order of Saint Michael and Saint George
 : Knight Grand Cross in the Order of Saints Maurice and Lazarus
 : Grand Cross with Chain in the Order of Vasa

References

J.E. Helmreich, Belgium and Europe: A Study in Small Power Diplomacy, 1976

J.E. Helmreich, "Paul Hymans and Henri Jaspar, Contrasting Diplomatic Styles, Studia Diplomatica, 39 (1986) 669–81.

External links
 
 Henri Jaspar in ODIS - Online Database for Intermediary Structures

|-

|-

|-

|-

|-

1870 births
1939 deaths
People from Schaerbeek
Catholic Party (Belgium) politicians
Prime Ministers of Belgium
Finance ministers of Belgium
Knights Grand Cross of the Order of Saints Maurice and Lazarus
Belgian Ministers of State
Members of the Chamber of Representatives (Belgium)
Burials at Schaerbeek Cemetery
Recipients of the Order of the White Eagle (Poland)